Phonobase Music Services is a Brazilian music services company and record label founded in 2007.

In 2008, the company develops an innovative music marketing strategy for the release of “Pareço Moderno”, second album from the band Cérebro Eletrônico. The album was released in multiple formats - from a special pack to single MP3 tracks - and an exclusive EP was freely distributed to more than 50 music blogs and sites.

In 2009, the company builds a Fan-To-Fan platform for the album "Terrorist!?" of Jumbo Elektro, allowing fans to sell the album in custom web pages and gain a percentage of the revenue.

Artists/Clients
 Cérebro Eletrônico
 Jumbo Elektro
 Druques
 Fabio Góes
 Luísa Maita (management/booking)
 Passo Torto (booking)

References

External links
Website
Blog

Brazilian independent record labels
Brazilian music websites
Talent agents